Albarrán is a Spanish surname. Notable people with the surname include:

Arturo Albarrán (born 1979), Mexican-born Salvadoran footballer
Herminia Albarrán Romero, American artist
Joaquín Albarrán (1860–1912), Cuban urologist
Aniceto de Castro Albarrán (1896–1981), Spanish priest and writer
Gerardo Villanueva Albarrán (born 1972), Mexican politician

Spanish-language surnames